Paul Nicolas (2 July 1914 – 23 July 2002) was a French boxer. He competed in the men's bantamweight event at the 1932 Summer Olympics. He died in Perpignan in July 2002 at the age of 88.

References

1914 births
2002 deaths
Bantamweight boxers
Boxers at the 1932 Summer Olympics
French male boxers
Olympic boxers of France
Sportspeople from Perpignan